The Deep is a British television drama serial produced by Tiger Aspect Productions for BBC Wales. Written by Simon Donald, The Deep stars Minnie Driver, James Nesbitt, and Goran Visnjic as members of the crew of a research submarine, who encounter disaster thousands of feet underwater in the Arctic Circle.

The drama was filmed over 12 weeks in and around coastal communities near Glasgow, Scotland, including Dumbarton, Ardrossan and Irvine. The five episode miniseries was broadcast in August 2010.

Synopsis 
A group of oceanographers seek a new source of bio-fuel in the deepest canyons of the Lomonosov Ridge. A disaster strikes their submarine, stranding them thousands of feet underwater. The group must now deal with clashing personalities and finding a way to the surface.

Cast

Episodes

Production 
Commissioning of The Deep was announced by the BBC in July 2009. The BBC announced the involvement of stars Minnie Driver, James Nesbitt and Goran Visnjic, and the start of production at the BBC's Dumbarton studios, in December 2009. The shoot ran for 12 weeks, concluding in March 2010. Submarine sets both physical and computer generated were designed by Production Designer Simon Bowles. Location filming also occurred in Ardrossan and the harbour at Irvine. Prosthetic make-up artist Linda A. Morton researched the sorts of injuries sustained by the characters by visiting a hospital burns unit, and referring to photographs of radiation burns.

Broadcast 
The Deep was broadcast weekly on BBC One and simulcast on BBC HD from 3 to 31 August 2010. The British Academy of Film and Television Arts held a public screening of the first episode on 19 July 2010. It was followed by a question-and-answer session with Nesbitt and some of the production staff. In Brazil, the series premiered on the channel +Globosat on Thursday, 16 August 2012, at 21 hours.

References

External links 
 
 The Deep at Tiger Aspect Productions
 

2010s British drama television series
2010 British television series debuts
2010 British television series endings
BBC Cymru Wales television shows
BBC television dramas
2010s British television miniseries
 Disaster television series
English-language television shows
Television series by Endemol
Television series by Tiger Aspect Productions